Kneiff is a hill in the Ardennes, in the commune of Troisvierges, in northern Luxembourg, near the tripoint shared with Belgium and Germany.  At 560 metres, it is the highest point in the country; it is 1 m taller than Buurgplaatz, which was previously considered the highest point until 1997.   It lies close to the town of Wilwerdange.

References

Mountains under 1000 metres
Mountains and hills of the Ardennes (Luxembourg)
Mountains and hills of the Eifel
Troisvierges
Highest points of countries